Aadhaar is a 2022 Indian Tamil-language mystery drama film directed by Ramnath Palanikumar and starring Karunas, Arun Pandian and Prabhakar. It was released on 23 September 2022.

Cast
Karunas as Pachamuthu
Arun Pandian as Head Constable Yusuf Bhai 
Prabhakar as Inspector Vijayan
Uma Riyaz Khan
Riythvika as Thulasi
Ineya as Saroja
Dileepan
Sridhar as Auto driver

Production
The title of the film relates to the concept of identity. The film marked Karunas’ reunion with director Ramnath Palanikumar after the comedy-drama, Ambasamudram Ambani. During the audio release of the film, Arun Pandian criticised actors who charge large fees.

Reception
The film was released on 23 September 2022 across Tamil Nadu. A critic from Cinema Express gave the film a mixed review, noting that "though it's not the first film that talks about the injustices served to the underprivileged, Aadhaar is a compelling watch that achieves what it intends to without much force-feeding--if you forgive the not-so-great craft". A reviewer from Times of India gave the film a mixed review, writing it is "a passable mystery that is undone by too much melodrama".

References

External links

2022 films
2020s Tamil-language films
Indian drama films